Sourav Kanojia (born 22 February 1997) is an Indian cricketer. He made his List A debut on 20 February 2021, for Odisha in the 2020–21 Vijay Hazare Trophy.

References

External links
 

1997 births
Living people
Indian cricketers
Odisha cricketers
Cricketers from Delhi